The 1961 All-Southwest Conference football team consists of American football players chosen by various organizations for All-Southwest Conference teams for the 1961 NCAA University Division football season.  The selectors for the 1961 season included the Associated Press (AP) and the United Press International (UPI).  Players selected as first-team players by both the AP and UPI are designated in bold.

All Southwest selections

Backs
 Jimmy Saxton, Texas (AP-1; UPI-1)
 Mike Cotten, Texas (AP-1; UPI-1)
 Lance Alworth, Arkansas (AP-1; UPI-1)
 Roland Jackson, Rice (AP-1;  UPI-1)

Ends
 Bob Moses, Texas (AP-1; UPI-1)
 John Burrell, Rice (AP-1)
 Jim Collier, Arkansas (UPI-1)

Tackles
 Don Talbert, Texas (AP-1; UPI-1)
 Robert Johnston, Rice (AP-1)
 Bobby Plummer, TCU (UPI-1)

Guards
 Dean Garrett, Arkansas (AP-1; UPI-1)
 Ray Schoenke, SMU (AP-1)
 Johnny Treadwell, Texas (AP-1)
 Adkins, Baylor (UPI-1)

Centers
 Bill Hicks, Baylor (AP-1)
 David Kristynik, Texas (UPI-1) (brother of Marvin Kristynik)

Key
AP = Associated Press

UPI = United Press International

Bold = Consensus first-team selection of both the AP and UPI

See also
1961 College Football All-America Team

References

All-Southwest Conference
All-Southwest Conference football teams